The Corbin Cabin is a log structure built by George T. Corbin in 1909 in the Nicholson Hollow area of what is now Shenandoah National Park. Corbin was forced to vacate the land on which the cabin sits in 1938, when the land was added to Shenandoah National Park.  The cabin is unique in that it is one of a small number of buildings located in Nicholson Hollow spared during the creation of the park, and still remains standing despite recent forest fires.

The cabin is maintained by the Potomac Appalachian Trail Club and is accessible within the park by means of Nicholson Hollow Trail.

As the George T. Corbin Cabin, it was added to the National Register of Historic Places in 1989.

References

National Register of Historic Places in Shenandoah National Park
Houses completed in 1909
Log cabins in the United States
Houses on the National Register of Historic Places in Virginia
Houses in Madison County, Virginia
National Register of Historic Places in Madison County, Virginia
1909 establishments in Virginia
Log buildings and structures on the National Register of Historic Places in Virginia